Accra High School is a Senior High school located in Accra, Ghana in West Africa. It initially started as a Boys School.

History
Accra High School was founded by the late Rev. James Thomas Roberts on 17 August 1923. The school, was located at beach avenue in Aayalolo, a suburb of Accra, Ghana. The school celebrated its first anniversary in August 1924 with a church service at the Holy Trinity Cathedral, Accra and the sermon was delivered by the Anglican Bishop of Accra, the late Dr. John Aglionby. Thus, there was a tie between the school and the Church of England. In 1924, the school entered its first candidates for the college of preceptors as well as for the Cambridge University, the royal society of Arts and Pitman's Shorthand Examinations in the United Kingdom. In 1926, most of the pupils sat and passed the junior Cambridge Examination. In that year, Mr. Frank Roberts, the eldest son of Rev. Roberts, joined the staff after graduating in Bachelor of Arts from the United Kingdom. He worked hard to enhance the Academic and Disciplinary standard of the school in Accra. In 1927, the late J.O. Ansah Johnson became the first student to pass the Cambridge School Certificate Examination.

Clubs
Interact
Amnesty International
Adinkra Drama Club
Readers, Writers and Debaters Club
Ghana Methodist Students Union(GHAMSU)
National Union of Presbyterian Students(NUPS-G)
Pentecost Students Association(PENSA)
School Choir
Regimental band
Cadet

See also
PeaceJam Ghana

References

 

Education in Accra
Educational institutions established in 1923
High schools in Ghana
1923 establishments in Gold Coast (British colony)